Jean (Jan) Marie Joseph, Baron Van Houtte (17 March 1907 – 23 May 1991) was a Belgian politician who served as the prime minister of Belgium from 1952 to 1954.

Born in Ghent, van Houtte held a doctorate in law and lectured at Ghent University and the University of Liège. He served as chairman of the Belgian Institute of Public Finance and represented the PSC-CVP in the Belgian Senate from 1949 to 1968.

Having served as Minister of Finance in the governments of Jean Duvieusart (1950) and Joseph Pholien (1950–1952), van Houtte replaced Pholien to become the 38th Prime Minister of Belgium in January 1952. His period in office was marked by disputes over conscription, and in particular the length of service of conscripts, and over the treatment of collaborators, where van Houtte controversially favoured a mild approach. An economic recession added to his troubles.

Van Houtte again served as Minister of Finance from 1958 to 1961 under Gaston Eyskens. He was governor of the World Bank, named an honorary Minister of State in 1966, and made a Baron in 1970.

Honours 
 : Created Baron van Houtte by Royal Decree in 1970. 
 : Minister of State, by Royal Decree.
 : President of the Royal Academy.
 : Commander in the Order of Leopold.
 : knight Grand Cross in the Order of the Crown.
 knight Grand Cross in the Order of Merit of the Federal Republic of Germany.

References

External links
 Jean Van Houtte in ODIS - Online Database for Intermediary Structures  

1907 births
1991 deaths
Belgian Ministers of State
Christian Social Party (Belgium, defunct) politicians
Finance ministers of Belgium
20th-century Belgian politicians
Academic staff of Ghent University
Prime Ministers of Belgium
University of Liège alumni
Grand Crosses 1st class of the Order of Merit of the Federal Republic of Germany